SNRT Radio National (الإذاعة الوطنية) is a Moroccan radio channel operated by the  state-owned public-broadcasting organization SNRT and specializing in news, sports, talk programmes, and popular music, broadcast from Rabat called in Arabic AL-IDAA ALWATANIA MAGHREBIA mean Moroccan National Radio

SNRT Radio National schedule
The channel focuses on news (with bulletins every hour), together with discussion and debate on public policy and social issues. SNRT Radio National also carries live coverage of sporting events Every Saturdays and Sundays.
SNRT Radio National's musical content is a mix of contemporary and popular Music with a focus on Moroccan productions, with a concentration on specialist music programming in the evening schedules.
The radio still retains several old songs and is still broadcasting them.

Among SNRT Radio National programmes:

-Sabah Beladi : 06h00-09h00 (All the week) (Samir Rayssouni/Abdelrahim Basselam/Hanan Ait Ammi/Houda Ait Ouaqqa)

-Liqae Al Maftouh : 09h00-12h00 (From Monday to Friday) (Jihane Mayna/Halima Alaoui)

-Hadith Al Dahira : 12h00-13h00(From Monday to Thursday) (Najma Alami)

-Atini Raeyak : 14h00-16h00 (From Monday to Friday) (Taoufik Bouchiti)

-Top Connexion : 17h00-19h00 (From Monday to Thursday) (Rim CHemaou/Taoufik Bouchiti)

-Maweid Li Niqach : 19h00-20h00 (only Monday)

-Sport : Min Al Mayadin Arriadiya (Saturdays)/Al Ahad Al Riyadi (Sundays) (Adil Alaoui)

etc...

SNRT Radio Regional
There are other Regional Stations in : Agadir, Al Hoceima, Casablanca, Dakhla, Fès, Laâyoune, Marrakech, Meknès, Ouarzazate, Oujda, Tanger and Tétouan.

References

External links
  

Radio stations in Morocco
European Broadcasting Union members
Multilingual broadcasters
Television channels and stations established in 1956
Société Nationale de Radiodiffusion et de Télévision